FUNKIST is a Japanese rock band formed in 2001 under the POWERPLAY label.

History
FUNKIST formed in 2001.
2005 Tokyo, Okinawa, Macau doing a live tour of the three largest cities.
2006 South Africa tour live dared. Start a live tour 47 prefectures of Japan.
Release the "white world" indie single in 2007. Shibuya Tower Records #1 two weeks in a row indies chart, Oricon indies chart topped the 14. China, Macau dared live tour. SHIBUYA O-EAST man live.
2008 SHIBUYA-AX one-man live. Participate in the live act of the Global Article 9 Conference
July - formed major debut with Pony Canyon. 
As a model for the item, "Artist" in the "Images Ashinaru" Images site offers live photos.
Year 2011
"ALL TOGETHER" released in August. Charity wrestling "Tohoku Earthquake All Together" production as the theme song.
5:12 p.m, October 13, Yōko Kasugai, the band's flutist, died at the age of 35.

Members

Former members

Drummer
, the last withdrawal LIVE at Shibuya O-WEST
 Yōko Kasugai, Died on October 13, 2011, at 12:17 p.m.

Discography

Indie

Single

〜BORDER〜
, 

The spring dance season
Earth House
Baby Cool 
(February 7, 2007) white world
White world
Winter skier 
THE LOVE SONG
THE LOVE SONG
Blue breeze
SOS (※ LIVE ver.)
Light (※ LIVE ver.)

Album
THANKIST
Happy day oh sunny day LALALA
U-WA I BELIEVE YOU
Firefly
Bluebird
Wei ~Yame Leon
SOS
NEVER EVER
GO AWAY
BLOOD
Month of water 
Resort
Before going to the resort
Sunset ☆ Abanchu-Roh
GO NOW
Light
SPRING BLUE
PASSION
Autumn breeze
Song of boy
1224
TYPHOON CONDITION
Banana Train 
(19 December 2007) RECORD PRAYER
THE LOVE SONG
Waist Shikereri Africa
Rasta in the Moonlight
White world
Winter skier
Memories photograph
Guy foul greeting and ghee foul dance
COLORS
Mr. Ankle show
Fireworks
Okinawa
Blue breeze
 Lion of Ya rising loneliness

Major

Single
(July 16, 2008) my girl
my girl
SUNRISE
(April 29, 2008 Live at SHIBUYA-AX) white world 
(3 December 2008) BORDER
BORDER ... TBS system " CDTV opening theme for December "2008
style (Single version)
Beautiful Star (Acoustic Live in travel festival '08 .9.21) 
(September 2, 2009) Moonrise carnival
Moonrise carnival
Rasta in the Moonlight
Kanabaru with Doronzu Ishimoto & Masami Yamamoto 
(December 2, 2009) Snow fairy
Snow fairy ... TV Tokyo anime series "FAIRY TAIL" Opening Theme 1
hira hira
South Africa 2009 
(10 March 2010) MAMA AFRICA
MAMA AFRICA ... PUMA "AFRICA CELEBRATION" theme song
2010
RISING HOPE 
(April 28, 2010) Ft. / Peace Ball
ft.
Peace Ball
Melody (Acoustic ver.)
(August 24, 2011) ALL TOGETHER
ALL TOGETHER
Yumenokakera ~ Abro la puerta ~
ALL TOGETHER (feat. player ver.) 
(February 22, 2012) SHINE
SHINE ... PSP game software for " Tales of the Heroes Twin Brave "Opening Theme
NEW DAYS ... PSP game software for " Tales of the Heroes Twin Brave "Ending Theme
brave ... PSP game software for " Tales of the Heroes Twin Brave "insert song
Only Waiting for your call ※ FUNKIST board.
Only special mini drama ※ Tales board.

Album
(February 18, 2009) SUNRISE 7
GO NOW
BORDER
Beautiful Star
CHANIN feat.OSD & Loco-Passion
style
Empty of children
Wind blowing in Keijia
my girl
Rain 29
Friends
SUNRISE
Fall on a rainy day 
(June 16, 2010) FUNKIST CUP
Traveling
Snow fairy
Piece ball
mama
MAMA AFRICA
Wonderful World
Don't cry baby
Smile Children
ft.
Olé! Ole! Me!
South Africa 2010
Sun Baby
Moonrise carnival
Song of love ("not alone (TV Drama)" theme song) 
"~ Dawn Dawn Dawn Dawn Dodon Welcome to JAPAN ~ Yoi" (May 8, 2011) live venue Limited Edition FUNKIST LIVE TOUR 2010-2011
BORDER (Nagasaki DRUM Be-7)
GO NOW (Nagasaki DRUM Be-7)
MC1
Forever and (Osaka JANUS)
Empty of children (Shibuya O-WEST)
Sun Baby (Osaka JANUS)
Banana Train (Shibuya O-WEST)
Piece ball (Osaka JANUS)
Wonderful World (Shibuya O-WEST)
SUNRISE (Nagasaki DRUM Be-7)
Encore
MC2
Moonrise Carnival (Shibuya O-WEST)
Song of Love (Shibuya O-WEST) 
"Live venue Limited Edition FUNKIST LIVE ~ REVOLUTION tour 2011 ~" (October 29, 2011)
Re (2011.5.29 Nagasaki DRUM Be-7)
MAMA AFRICA (2011.6.17 Shinsaibashi JANUS)
Fall on a rainy day (2011.5.29 Nagasaki DRUM Be-7)
MC1 (2011.5.28 Nagasaki DRUM Be-7)
The spring dance season (2011.5.29 Nagasaki DRUM Be-7)
MC2 (2011.7.3 Shibuya O-WEST)
Style (2011.7.3 Shibuya O-WEST)
mama (2011.6.17 Shinsaibashi JANUS)
Empty of children (2011.7.3 Shibuya O-WEST)
White world (2011.6.17 Shinsaibashi JANUS)
CRAQUE (2011.7.3 Shibuya O-WEST)
Wonderful World (2011.6.17 Shinsaibashi JANUS)
1 / 6.9 billion (2011.5.28 Nagasaki DRUM Be-7)
+575 Voice of Angkor (all venues)
Corner of Cool Men (2011.7.3 Shibuya O-WEST) 
(April 11, 2012) 7
CRAQUE
SHINE
Dance in the world
ROOTS
Hello
Bonds (Album Version)
Seven
ZAN
ALL TOGETHER
Song of the 6-year-old
Theme of secret squadron FUNKIST7
Whose life is this
1/6900000000
Waiting for your call
NEW DAYS 
(April 21, 2012) live venue Limited Edition FUNKIST LIVE TOUR 2011 "COLLAVOLUTION tour 2011"
Border (2011 Osaka · umeda AKASO)
Moonrise Carnival (2011/12/2 Aichi Nagoya ell. FITS ALL)
ALL TOGETHER (2011/12/10 Fukuoka · DRUM Be-1)
Snow Fairy (2011/11/19 Hiroshima · Cave Be)
Sun Baby (2011/11/6 Nagasaki · DRUM Be-7)
Song of Love (2012/12/2 Aichi Nagoya ell. FITS ALL)
Piece ball (Nov 23, 2011 Niigata · CLUB RIVERST)
Wonderful World (2011/11/23 Niigata · CLUB RIVERST)
SUNRISE (2011/11/23 Niigata · CLUB RIVERST)

Major mini album
(February 2, 2011) Pieceful
1/6900000000
Very cold
Sayonara
Sideburn
Re
Indefinitely
Instrumental Medley (wind-guinea foul dance ~ Passion blowing Keijia) [Live at Osaka JANUS 2010.12.13]
Song of Love [Live at Nagasaki Drum Be-7 2010.12.04]

DVD
COLORS
The Thank You tour to South Africa

Tie-up list
"BORDER" - " CDTV opening theme song for December "2008 ( TBS system)
"Snow fairy" - " FAIRY TAIL "Opening Theme 1 Song ( TV Tokyo anime series + the best song yet )
"MAMA AFRICA" - PUMA "AFRICA CELEBRATION" theme song
"Ft." - " FAIRY TAIL "Opening Theme 3 Song ( TV Tokyo anime series )
"Peace Ball" - " Super Soccer "ending theme ( TBS system)
"ALL TOGETHER" - " Tohoku Earthquake charity wrestling · ALL TOGETHER "official theme song
"SHINE" - PSP game software for " Tales of the Heroes Twin Brave "Opening Theme
"NEW DAYS" - PSP game software for " Tales of the Heroes Twin Brave "Ending Theme
"Brave" - PSP game software for " Tales of the Heroes Twin Brave "insert song

Radio
FM NACK5 "Lucky 7 to even FUNKIST radio-time" (25:40 - 26:00 every Thursday " STROBE NIGHT! "within)

References

External links

迷言Shu not affect a heart on a blog by FUNKIST.
How to make FUNKIST Someya Saigo special planning blog.

2001 establishments in Japan
Japanese rock music groups
Musical groups established in 2001
Pony Canyon artists